The Men's National Collegiate Athletic Association is an athletic association in the Philippines, and is the direct counterpart of the older Women's National Collegiate Athletic Association (founded in 1970). The Men's National Collegiate Athletic Association (MNCAA) is exclusive for men. The MNCAA was founded in 2004. Competition is divided into three divisions: Seniors for college students, Juniors for high school students, and Midgets for grade school and first year high school students. The competing sports of the tournament are Basketball, Volleyball, Futsal, Table Tennis, Badminton and Streetdance.

Member schools

Metro Manila

Colleges

High school
St. Stephen's High School- Stephenians

Cordillera Administrative Region

Baguio Central University BCU Eagles
 Baguio Colleges Foundation BCF
Benguet State University BSU
 Cordillera Career Development College CCDC Admirals
 Pines City College PCC
STI Colleges, Baguio STI Baguio Olympians
St. Louis University (Baguio) SLU Navigators
University of Baguio UB Cardinals
University of the Cordilleras UC Jaguars
University of the Philippines Baguio UPB Fighting Maroons

Central Luzon

St. Scholastica's Academy, San Fernando

Calabarzon

Bicol Region

Visayas

MNCAA Championships

Badminton
Basketball

Table Tennis
Volleyball

Streetdance
Futsal

External links
MNCAA Official Website

References

Student sport in the Philippines